Ein Keloheinu (in Hebrew:  אֵין כֵּאלֹהֵינוּ, "there is none like our God") is a well known Jewish hymn. Orthodox Jews pronounce it as Ein Kelokeinu  when referring to it outside of prayer, in order to avoid taking the name of God in vain or otherwise violating the sanctity of reverence to the Almighty.

Ein Keloheinu is sometimes chanted at the end of the morning service (shacharit). In the Ashkenazi tradition outside of Israel, it is only said at the end of Shabbat and festival services, towards the end of the Mussaf service, immediately before a Talmudic lesson on the making of the Temple incense. However, in the vast majority of Ashkenazic communities in the Land of Israel, as well as in all Sephardi and Chasidic weekday morning prayer services it is said daily. In some other regional traditions it is used elsewhere in the liturgy, but it seems to be known worldwide. In many synagogues it is sung; in some Orthodox synagogues it is only said quietly by every person for themselves and is not regarded as a critical part of the prayer service.

One explanation for the prayer is that its 20 sentences each count as a blessing. Jews are exhorted to make at least 100 blessings daily [Talmud, Menachot 43b]. On weekdays, the Shemoneh Esrei (or "Amidah") prayer contains 19 blessings and is said three times, totaling 57 blessings, and the remaining 43 are said during other parts of daily services as well as during other events throughout the day. On Shabbat and festivals, however, the Amidah consists of only seven blessings. Ein Keloheinu was designed to ensure that everybody would say at least 100 blessings a day, even on those days when the Amidah is shorter.

Four different names are used to refer to God in this prayer:
Elohim (אלהים) – God
Adon (אדון) – Lord or Master
Melekh (מלך) – King
Moshia` (מושיע) – Savior
These names of God are in the same sequence in which they appear in the Torah. The kabbalists saw, in the use of four names for God, references to four different Divine qualities.

Text

The original version

The Hebrew text is as it appears in all siddurim, both Ashkenazic and Sephardic.
°  The last line of the piyut itself is "You are our Savior." The Ashkenazic liturgy follows this immediately (as part of the chanting) with "You are the one before whom ...."  followed by a Talmudic description of the mixing of the incense spices for the Temple.
°°  The Sephard, and the Sephardic/Mizrahi liturgies follow the last line of the piyut with the words, "You will save us," followed by the quotation of Psalm 102:14, "You will arise ...."

Among Ashkenazim, the additional line and the Talmudic lesson on the making of incense which follows it is considered optional and so that line and lesson might be omitted.

This prayer appears in the liturgy as early as the Siddur Rav Amram (ca 875) – where the first verse is "Who is like ..." and the second verse is "There is none like ...", but the present sequence appears in the Mahzor Vitry and in Rashi (both late 11th century) and a century later in Maimonides.   The present sequence is viewed as, first, a declaration against all other religions, then a challenge to all other religions, and thereafter as worship.   Additionally, Abudraham (ca. 1340) pointed that the initial "א" from the first verse, the  "מ" from the second, and the "נ" from the third formed Amen, and taking the Barukh from the fourth verse and the Atah from the final verse, together produce "Amen. Blessed are Thou" – as if the end of one prayer and the beginning of another, and this serves as a suitable mnemonic to keep the verses in proper sequence.

Ladino version
In many Sephardic congregations, Ein Keiloheinu is often sung in Ladino (also known as Judaeo-Spanish) or alternating Hebrew and Ladino, but it retains its Hebrew name.

Ladino lyrics

In popular culture
Philadelphia based post-hardcore band mewithoutYou, incorporated words from the Ein Keloheinu hymn into the song "Four Fires," a B-side track from their fifth full-length studio album, Ten Stories.

See also
 Jewish services
 List of Jewish prayers and blessings
 Names of God in Judaism

References
Specific

General
 Eisenberg, R. The JPS Guide to Jewish Traditions, Jewish Publication Society of America, October 2004. 
 Telushkin J. Jewish Literacy: The Most Important Things to Know About the Jewish Religion, Its People and Its History , William Morrow; 1st edition (April 26, 1991).

External links
 Audio file "Ein Keloheinu" (regular); MP3
 Audio file "Ein Keloheinu" (slow); MP3
 "Ein Keloheinu""Ein Keloheinu" text;
  links to multiple audio files of different melodies for "Ein Keloheinu";

Shacharit
Mussaf
Shabbat prayers
Jewish liturgical poems
Hebrew words and phrases in Jewish prayers and blessings
Siddur of Orthodox Judaism
Jewish prayer and ritual texts